Cephalodiscus gilchristi is a sessile hemichordate belonging to the order Cephalodiscida. It is found in South Africa in 1908.

Parasites
The parasitic copepod Zanclopus cephalodisci has been found in the intestines of Cephalodiscus gilchristi.

References

gilchristi